Golden Sweet is a cultivar of domesticated apple.

The origin of the Golden Sweet apple

The apple originated in the American state of Connecticut, but beyond that, its parentage is a mystery.

The size of a Golden Sweet apple

A Golden Sweet apple is a medium- to large-sized apple.

When they ripen

Golden Sweet apples usually ripen from late July through early August, though this depends on the area. The harvest may continue into September.

The flavor of a Golden Sweet apple

The flavor of a Golden Sweet apple is very sweet, rich, and has almost no tartness. The flavor has been described as "honey sweet". Golden Sweet has no acid flavor.

When Golden Sweet bears apples

Golden Sweet tend to bear apples, every other year.

What the Golden Sweet is used for

Golden Sweet apples are good for fresh-eating, also for apple sauce or apple cider.

See also

 Tolman Sweet, a similar, but not quite the same apple

References

External links and references
 One reference

Apple cultivars
American apples